Pourvoirie Mirage Aerodrome  is located on the Trans-Taiga Road near Mirage Lodge, Quebec, Canada.

See also
 Lac Polaris (Pourvoirie Mirage Inc) Water Aerodrome

References

Registered aerodromes in Nord-du-Québec